Cadenberge (in High German, in Low Saxon: Cumbarg) is a municipality in the district of Cuxhaven, in Lower Saxony, Germany. Since 1 November 2016, the former municipality Geversdorf is part of the municipality Cadenberge.

Cadenberge belonged to the Prince-Archbishopric of Bremen, established in 1180. In 1648 the Prince-Archbishopric was transformed into the Duchy of Bremen, which was first ruled in personal union by the Swedish Crown - interrupted by a Danish occupation (1712-1715) - and from 1715 on by the Hanoverian Crown. The Kingdom of Hanover incorporated the Duchy in a real union and the Ducal territory became part of the new Stade Region, established in 1823.

Regular events 
Spring Market third weekend in April
Shooting Cadenberge fourth weekend in June (Saturday)
Summer (up to 2008 street festival) third Saturday in July
Shooting Cadenberge-Langenstraße first weekend in September (Sunday)
Autumn Fair third weekend in October
Advent Cadenberge meeting of the clubs (up to Christmas 2004) third advent

References